Amina Abdi Rabar (born 1989) is a Kenyan TV Presenter and Radio Presenter, based in Nairobi, Kenya. She hosts the breakfast show on  98.4 Capital FM, Nairobi She is also fluent in English and Swahili. She hosts The Trend.

Biography 
Amina was born in Nairobi, Kenya. She lived in Kawangware and Eastleigh, two modest estates in Nairobi, for a significant portion of her life. Both of her parents are from the Borana community, however her mother is from Isiolo and her father is from Moyale.

Education 
She went to Kenya High School until completion in 2006.

Career 
Amina Abdi enrolled straight into Homeboyz Radio at a radio school that the station had just launched. She worked hard and landed a scholarship of the best student and that is how her career took off.

Around 2012, when she was working at Homeboyz Radio, she would fill in as a senior host when necessary. She was so effective that you would not have known she was a young presenter. She eventually earned her Saturday Night Show.

Soon after, Chris Kirubi spotted her and offered Amina a job replacement of Joey Muthengi at Capital Fm. 

Since then, she has worked for renowned media organizations and stations like Ebru, K24, NTV's The Trend, and Maisha Magic East's the Turn Up.

Currently she hosts Maisha Magic East’s Turn Up alongside DJ Joe Mfalme and also NTV's The Trend show.

Amina Abdi who doubles up as a singer has worked on song with popular artists Jay A, K-Letta, Lon Jon and Octopizzo.

References

External links

 

Kenyan television presenters
Kenyan women television presenters
Kenyan radio presenters
Kenyan women radio presenters
1989 births
Living people